The World's Largest Stove (also called The Michigan Stove and Mammoth Garland) was an oversized replica of a kitchen stove that was made for the 1893 Chicago World's Fair as a representation of Michigan Stove Company and its products. After the fair finished, the replica was displayed and used for advertising for decades at the company's headquarters in downtown Detroit. The wooden stove replica eventually deteriorated to a poor state and in 1974 the pieces were stored in a warehouse. In the late 1990s, the replica was restored and given a permanent home at Michigan State Fairgrounds. In 2011 it was destroyed by fire, likely caused by a lightning strike.

Origin and design

The World's Largest Stove was an oversized reproduction of Michigan Stove Company's popular kitchen cooking stove. The company, founded by Jeremiah Dwyer in 1872, wanted to grab the attention of visitors attending the 1893 Chicago World's Fair so had the replica built to represent what the company manufactured. The company's vice president George Harrison Barbour was appointed to the national commission board of the World's Fair and passed the idea of making a giant replica onto Dwyer. Company superintendent William J. Keep was charged with designing and engineering the replica; he supervised its construction and coordinated the logistics of the work.

The stove was finished with hand-carved basswood, Michigan white pine, and laminated redwood. The sides were painted with a unique metallic appearance to look like one of the company's Garland brand steel kitchen ranges. The giant model that appeared to be walking formed the company's exhibit pavilion in Section O. Cast-iron stoves were placed under the mammoth Garland stove to showcase the company's products, and nearby salesmen discussed the stoves' qualities.

Return to Michigan

The stove was taken back to Detroit after the World's Fair finished; it was placed on a pedestal in front of Michigan Stove Company's manufacturing factory on East Jefferson Avenue at Adair Street. There was an official celebration on July 31, 1902, of the unveiling of a bronze tablet, placed there to mark the exact spot upon which formerly stood the Pontiac tree around which occurred the battle of Bloody Run on July 31, 1763. The tablet was located on a brick wall that ran between the company's buildings on Jefferson avenue from the main office building to the factory building. Between the two buildings once stood the big Garland. The center of this stove between the legs was exactly where the old Pontiac tree grew. The tablet was placed in the center on top of the six-foot high wall immediately in front that advertises Largest makers of stoves and ranges. 

The factory building partially burned down in 1907 but the replica survived undamaged. In 1927, it was moved to the front lawn of the newly-formed Detroit-Michigan Stove Company plant located at the entrance to Belle Isle Bridge in Detroit. It was placed on a new base for a display to the public. At that time the sides of the gargantuan replica was repainted to Detroit-Michigan Stove Co. Between 1957 and 1965, Schaefer Bakeries leased the stove at that location and used it to advertise its bread, painting Schaefer Bread on its sides.

Michigan State Fairgrounds 
In 1965 the stove was relocated to Michigan State Fairgrounds on Woodward Avenue in Detroit, Michigan from the factory headquarters near Belle Isle. The stove eventually deteriorated due to weather and broke into pieces; in 1974, the Detroit Free Press wrote that "[t]he carved bottom trim on the side facing Woodward split and fell apart; dozens of layers of blistered, peeling paint made the surface resemble dried, caked and cracked black mud. The roof sagged at crazy angles. The gate of the fence surrounding the base was open; empty wine bottles, mounds of litter, and the soggy remains of a campfire lay on the trampled grass beneath the stove." Later in the year the pieces were stored inside a warehouse at Detroit Historical Museum. The Detroit Historical Society's museum then formed the Detroit Stove Restoration Committee to solicit time and money contributions to save the replica.

 In the early 1990s, interest in restoring the replica stove grew. advocates termed the stove a Detroit industrial landmark, representing Detroit's nineteenth-century prominence as a center for metalwork and foundries, and its claim in the late 1800s and early 1900s as the world's stove capital. A restoration project was formed, led by former state fair manager John C. Hertel. Donations from companies, unions, and individuals raised $300,000. In 1995, twenty truckloads of pieces of the wooden replica were taken to Michigan State Fairgrounds, where artisans from Greenfield Village started the restoration project, which involved the removal of twelve coats of lead-based paint and the replacement of forty percent of the original wood that was beyond repair. During the restoration. a rubberized top layer was added for better protection against rain and snow.

Michigan governor John Engler unveiled the finished restoration on August 24, 1998. The replica's legs were framed by a concrete wall bearing the names of the major contributors. The walkways leading up to the replica stove were paved with memorial bricks naming donors who had each given $25 for the restoration project. The stove then was a major attraction for the annual state fair; it was promoted as far away as Chicago and Indianapolis, some 300 miles away, and across the border in Windsor, Ontario.

Michigan's state fair had been eliminated altogether by 2009 due to budget cuts and a new home for the replica stove was sought. Ideas for a new home included the Henry Ford museum, and the Garland resort lodge at Lewiston, Michigan.

Demise 
A new home for the World's Largest Stove at the Michigan State Fairgrounds was never found, as it was ultimately destroyed by fire on August 13, 2011. A Detroit Fire Department chief said the fire was from natural causes, and that a lightning strike was the likely cause. Firefighters arrived around 8:00 pm but the wooden replica had already burned down to its steel frame and could not be saved. The State of Michigan planned to return the bricks purchased as memorials and used as paving for the walkways to their donors.

Footnotes

Sources

External links 

 

Buildings and structures in Metro Detroit
Former buildings and structures in Michigan
History of Detroit
Stoves
Tourist attractions in Metro Detroit
World's Columbian Exposition
World's fair sculptures